Cepu (formerly Tjepoe or Tjepu) is a district (kecamatan) of Indonesia, in Blora Regency, Central Java Province.

History and economy
In colonial times, when Indonesia was part of the Dutch East Indies, Cepu was known for its teak (timber) and oil. The oil refineries, operated by Bataafse Petroleum Maatschappij, could produce about 11,000 bpd. They were blown up by the Dutch immediately after the Japanese landings on the island of Java in 1942. The invaders, one of whose objectives was the oilfields, committed atrocities. The teak is still highly regarded. By 2001, the oil reserves were thought to have been exhausted; but new ones have been discovered by ExxonMobil, which may yield 235,000 bpd.

Weather, climate and ecology

Language

Subdivisions
Cepu District comprises the following rural and urban villages:

Transportation
Cepu lies between Semarang, capital of Central Java Province, and Surabaya, capital of East Java Province, and is connected to them by road.

Cepu Forest Railway is a steam-powered narrow-gauge light logging railway which also runs tourist trains.

People
 Mukti Ali (1923-2004), Minister of Religious Affairs of the Republic of Indonesia; born in Cepu
 Sekarmadji Maridjan Kartosuwiryo (1905-1962), Indonesian Islamic mystic; born in Cepu
 Leonardus Benjamin Moerdani (1932-2004), general, Commander-in-Chief of ABRI 1983-1988, Minister of Defense and Security; born in Cepu

References

Further reading
 
 

Blora Regency
Districts of Central Java